Manuela Stellmach (born 22 February 1970 in Berlin) is a former freestyle swimmer from East Germany, who was a member of the women's relay team that won the gold medal in the 4×100 m freestyle relay at the 1988 Summer Olympics in Seoul, South Korea. At the same tournament she captured the bronze medal in the individual 200 m freestyle. Four years later, when Barcelona, Spain hosted the Summer Olympics, Stellmach ended up third (bronze) with the women's relay team from the Unified Germany.

External links
 
 
 

1970 births
Living people
Olympic swimmers of East Germany
Olympic swimmers of Germany
German female freestyle swimmers
Swimmers at the 1988 Summer Olympics
Swimmers at the 1992 Summer Olympics
Olympic gold medalists for East Germany
Olympic bronze medalists for East Germany
Olympic bronze medalists for Germany
Medalists at the 1988 Summer Olympics
Medalists at the 1992 Summer Olympics
Swimmers from Berlin
People from East Berlin
World record setters in swimming
Olympic bronze medalists in swimming
World Aquatics Championships medalists in swimming
European Aquatics Championships medalists in swimming
Recipients of the Patriotic Order of Merit in gold
Recipients of the Silver Laurel Leaf
Olympic gold medalists in swimming
20th-century German women